is a Japanese photographer, a member of Magnum Photos who has specialized in photographing the far east.

Born in Kanda (Tokyo), Kubota studied politics at Waseda University, graduating in 1962. In 1961 he met the Magnum photographers René Burri, Elliott Erwitt, and Burt Glinn. He then studied journalism and international politics at the University of Chicago, and became an assistant to Erwitt and Cornell Capa, in 1965, a freelance photographer.

Kubota photographed the 1968 US presidential election and then Ryūkyū islands before their return to Japan in 1972. He then photographed Saigon in 1975, North Korea in 1978, and China in 1979–85, and the USA in 1988–92, resulting in books and exhibitions.

Kubota won the Mainichi Art Prize in 1980, and the Annual Award of the Photographic Society of Japan in 1981. Three of his publications won him the first Kodansha Publishing Culture Award in 1970: "Black People", and essays on Calcutta and the Ryūkyū islands.

Exhibitions by Kubota
"The President's People." Neikrug Gallery (New York), 1976.
. Nikon Salon (Tokyo), 1976.
"Daigan no nagare". Odakyu Department Store, 1976.
"Keirin mugen". Matsuya (Ginza), 1982.
"On China." ICP (New York), 1982.
"Chūgoku mange". Matsuya (Ginza), 1986.
"Korea: Above the 38th Parallel." ICP (New York), 1986.
"Magnum en Chine" The Rencontres d'Arles festival, Arles, France, 1988.
"China." Tokyo Fuji Art Museum (Tokyo), 1991
"From Sea to Shining Sea: A Portrait of America." Corcoran Gallery of Art (Washington, D.C.), 1992
"Out of the East: Recent Photographs of Asia." Equitable Gallery (New York), 1997
"China: Fifty Years inside the People's Republic." Asia Society (New York), 1999–2000 
"Can We Feed Ourselves?" Asia Society (New York); School of Oriental and African Studies (London), 2001/2002
"USA 1963–69 and Burma 1970–78." Photo Gallery International (Shibaura, Tokyo), 2009.

Books by Kubota
Daigan no nagare: Chūgoku no fūdo to ningen. Tokyo: PPS, 1980.  Exhibition catalogue.
Daigan no nagare: Chūgoku no fūdo to ningen. Tokyo: Geibunsha, 1981. 
Keirin mugen. Tokyo: Iwanani Shoten, 1982. 
Yūkyū no daichi Chūgoku: 5000-nen no rekishi o yuku. Higashi Murayama: Kyōikusha, 1985. . 
Kōzan senkyū. Tokyo: Iwanami Shoten, 1985. . 
China. Hamburg: Hoffmann und Campe, 1985. . 
Chūgoku mange. Tokyo: PPS, 1986.   Exhibition catalogue.
Chūgoku mange. Tokyo: TBS Britannica, 1986. . 
Chine. [Neuilly-sur-Seine]: [Ed. Hologramme], 1987. 
Zhongguo feng wu (中國風物). Hong Kong: San lian shu dian Xianggang fen dian, 1987. . 
Chōsen 38-dosen no kita. Higashi Murayama: Kyōikusha, 1988. . 
Chōsen meihō Hakutōsan Kongōsan. Tokyo: Iwanami Shoten, 1988. . 
Chine: Photos de Hiroji Kubota. Paris: École nationale supérieure des Beaux-Arts, 1988. 
Pungnyŏk ŭi sanha: Kubotʻa Hiroji sajinjip: Paektusan, Kŭmgangsan (북녘의산하: 구보타히로지사진집: 백두산 금강산). Seoul: Hanʼgyŏre Sinmunsa, 1988. 
Shinpen keirin mugen. Tokyo: Iwanami, 1990. . 
Shinpen  Kōzan shinkyū. Tokyo: Iwanami Shoten, 1991. . 
Haruka naru daichi Chūgoku. Hachiōji: Tokyo Fuji Bijutsukan, 1991. 
Amerika no shōzō. Tokyo: Shūeisha, 1992. . 
From Sea to Shining Sea: A Portrait of America. New York: Norton, 1992. . 
Amerika: ein Porträt. Hamburg: Hoffmann und Campe, 1992. . 
Ichiban tōi kuni: Kita Chōsen annai. Tokyo: Takarajima, 1994: . 
China. New York: Norton, 1995. . 
Ajia to shokuryō / Can We Feed Ourselves? Tokyo: Ie no Hikari Kyōkai, 1999. .  The captions specify the place in both Japanese and English but the explanatory text is in Japanese only.
Can We Feed Ourselves? A Focus on Asia. New York: Magnum, 1999. . 
Out of the East: Transition and Tradition in Asia. New York: Norton, 1999. . 
Japan. New York: Norton, 2005. .

Notes

External links
Photographs of Japan, BBC.

Japanese photographers
Magnum photographers
Photography in Myanmar
Photography in China
Photography in Korea
1939 births
Living people